A senatorial election was held on November 12, 1963 in the Philippines. The 1963 elections were known as a midterm election as the date when the elected officials take office falls halfway through President Diosdado Macapagal's four-year term.

The Liberal Party won control of the chamber after having ten seats out of the 24-member Senate, as the 2-member Grand Alliance (the old Progressive Party) were caucusing with them, plus Alejandro Almendras of the Nacionalistas who personally supported Senate President Ferdinand Marcos.

Retiring incumbents

Nacionalista Party
Oscar Ledesma

Results
The Nacionalista Party and the Liberal Party each won four seats.

Nacionalistas Arturo Tolentino and Gil Puyat, and Liberal Ambrosio Padilla all defended their seats.

Five winners are neophyte senators. These are Juan Liwag, Gerardo Roxas and Tecla San Andres Ziga of the Liberal Party, and the Nacionalistas' Jose Diokno and Rodolfo Ganzon.

Incumbent Nacionalista senators Eulogio Balao, Roseller T. Lim and Cipriano Primcias Sr., and Rogelio de la Rosa of the Liberal Party all lost.

Key:
 ‡ Seats up
 + Gained by a party from another party
 √ Held by the incumbent
 * Held by the same party with a new senator
 ^ Vacancy

Per candidate

Per party

See also
Commission on Elections
5th Congress of the Philippines

References

External links
 Official website of the Commission on Elections

1963
Senate election